Balykin (from балык meaning balyk, dried and salted salmon) is a Russian masculine surname, its feminine counterpart is Balykina. It may refer to
Ivan Balykin (born 1990), Russian racing cyclist
Victor Balykin (born 1947), Russian physicist 
Yuliya Balykina (1984–2015), Belarusian sprinter

Russian-language surnames